"Seder Anything" is the twenty-first episode of the second season of the CW television series Gossip Girl. It premiered on CTV, Monday, 20 April 2009.

Plot
Serena returns from her trip to Spain with Poppy and Gabriel. Blair makes a secret deal with Nate's grandfather. Dan takes a job to earn money for college.

Cultural references
The episode title is derived from Say Anything... (1989), a romantic movie starring John Cusack and Ione Skye which was written and directed by Cameron Crowe.

Reception

References
 http://www.tv.com/Gossip+Girl/Seder+Anything/episode/1255273/recap.html

Gossip Girl (season 2) episodes
2009 American television episodes
Passover television episodes